Zdihovo is an abandoned settlement in the Municipality of Kočevje in southern Slovenia. It was inhabited by Gottschee Germans. At the start of the Second World War its original population was expelled. The area is part of the traditional region of Lower Carniola and is now included in the Southeast Slovenia Statistical Region.

The local church was dedicated to Our Lady of Sorrows and was a Baroque pilgrimage church built in 1702. It was demolished in 1954.

References

External links
Zdihovo on Geopedia
Pre–World War II map of Zdihovo with oeconyms and family names

Populated places in the Municipality of Kočevje